Ingrida Suchánková (born 8 February 1993) is a Slovak karateka. At the 2016 World Karate Championships held in Linz, Austria, she won one of the bronze medals in the women's kumite 61 kg event. She is also a gold medalist and three-time bronze medalist in this event at the European Karate Championships.

In 2015, she represented Slovakia at the European Games held in Baku, Azerbaijan. She competed in the women's kumite 61 kg event without winning a medal. In the elimination round, she lost one match and two other matches ended in a draw and as a result, she did not advance to compete in the semi-finals.

At the 2017 World Games held in Wrocław, Poland, she won the bronze medal in the women's kumite 61 kg event. In her bronze medal match she defeated Justyna Gradowska of Poland.

In June 2021, she competed at the World Olympic Qualification Tournament held in Paris, France hoping to qualify for the 2020 Summer Olympics in Tokyo, Japan.  In November 2021, she lost her bronze medal match in the women's 61 kg event at the World Karate Championships held in Dubai, United Arab Emirates.

She won the bronze medal in the women's 61 kg event at the 2022 World Games held in Birmingham, United States.

Achievements

References 

Living people
1993 births
Place of birth missing (living people)
Slovak female karateka
World Games medalists in karate
World Games bronze medalists
Competitors at the 2017 World Games
Competitors at the 2022 World Games
Karateka at the 2015 European Games
European Games competitors for Slovakia
21st-century Slovak women